Htikhi (also spelt Htee Khee) is a town in Dawei Township, Tanintharyi Region, Myanmar. The town is home to one of 7 official border trade posts with Thailand. A roads project was initiated in 2019, to link Htikhi to the Dawei Special Economic Zone. Htee Khee was formerly the headquarters of the Karen National Union's 4th brigade until 2012.

References 

Populated places in Tanintharyi Region
Myanmar–Thailand border crossings